Rasmus Giertz (born June 3, 1994, in Enköping) is a Swedish politician of the Sweden Democrats party who has served as a Member of the Riksdag for the Dalarna County constituency since September 2022.

Biography
Giertz was elected regional leader of the Young Swedes SDU (the youth wing of the SD) in Dalarna in 2018. He later became the regional chairman for the SD in Dalarna in 2022 and stood for the party during the 2022 Swedish general election in the Dalarna County constituency, but was not elected and instead designated as a substitute for Sara Gille. Following the election, Giertz was appointed to the seat after Gille went on maternity leave. He serves as a member of the foreign affairs committee in the Riksdag.

In 2022, Giertz was appointed as a full member of the Riksdag to fill in for Mats Nordberg who died in office.

In 2018, Giertz became the source of some controversy during a public debate when he suggested foreign rapists should be deported while Swedish rapists should "stretch yourself, get a gym card and stop raping women." Giertz later claimed his comments had been taken out of context but were "clumsily worded."

In December 2022, Giertz filed a police statement after being the victim of assault at a pub in Borlänge. Giertz stated a group of men verbally abused their party and later physically attacked him outside. The case was handed over to the Special Prosecutor's Chamber which investigates incidents involving politicians, judges and special officials.

In September 2022, Giertz reported that two men had followed and threatened him outside of his home in Falun. A man in his 20s was later charged with harassment against Giertz. In response to the incident, Swedish National Council for Crime Prevention included Giertz's name on a report discussing threats against politicians which found younger elected officials were more likely to be victims of threats.

References 

Living people
1994 births
21st-century Swedish politicians
Members of the Riksdag 2022–2026
Members of the Riksdag from the Sweden Democrats
People from Enköping